Walter McDougal may refer to:

Walter A. McDougall (born 1946), American historian
Walt McDougall (1858–1938), American cartoonist